New Experience is the debut album by Michelle Malone, released in 1988. The album was critically very well received. Produced as an independent LP on Sky Records, it led to Malone signing with Arista Records. Among the musicians on the album was R.E.M.'s drummer Bill Berry. The LP was re-released on CD in 1993 with six new tracks.

Track listing
All tracks composed by Michelle Malone; except where indicated
"Circus Circus"
"Eastern Pleasures"
"All I Can Give You (Is Me)"
"Into the Night" (Kristin Hall)
"Long Love Century"
"Big Black Bag"
"Until the Day"
"Under the Memphis Sky"
"Incident"
"The First 24"
"Counting Stars"
"Sure Thing"
"New Day Song"
"32 Seconds"
"Skull, Cross, Bones, Flesh"

Personnel
Michelle Malone
John Keane
Bill Berry
Ed Bradley
Gerard McHugh
Kyle Pilgrim
Sandy Garfinkle

References

1988 debut albums
Albums produced by John Keane (record producer)
Sky Records albums